Pleuronectidae, also known as righteye flounders, are a family of flounders. They are called "righteye flounders" because most species lie on the sea bottom on their left sides, with both eyes on their right sides. The Paralichthyidae are the opposite, with their eyes on the left side. A small number of species in Pleuronectidae can also have their eyes on the left side, notably the members of the genus Platichthys.

Their dorsal and anal fins are long and continuous, with the dorsal fin extending forward onto the head. Females lay eggs that float in mid-water until the larvae develop, and they sink to the bottom.

They include many important commercially fished species, including not only the various fish called flounders, but also the European plaice, the halibuts, the lemon sole, the common dab, the Pacific Dover sole, and the flukes.

The name of the family is derived from the Greek πλευρά (pleura), meaning "rib" or "side", and νηκτόν (nekton), meaning "swimming".

Classification 
The family has four subfamilies:
 Pleuronectinae – 27 genera and about 60 species in the Northern Hemisphere (includes Eopsettinae, Hippoglossinae, Hippoglossoidinae, and Lyopsettinae recognized by some as valid subfamilies)
 Paralichthodinae – one species off southern Africa
 Poecilopsettinae –  three genera and about 20 species in tropical and subtropical oceans
 Rhombosoleinae – nine genera and about 20 species in the Southern Hemisphere

In some classifications, the last three subfamilies are raised to the level of families.

See also 
 Bothidae, the lefteye family of flounders

References 

 
Marine fish families
Taxa named by Georges Cuvier
Fish of Korea